Jama Masjid is a mosque in the town of Kanchipuram in Tamil Nadu, India. It was constructed by more than three hundred years ago by the nawabs of the Carnatic. One of the 108 shivalingas in the town are located inside the mosque.

References 
 

Mosques in Tamil Nadu
Buildings and structures in Kanchipuram district
Kanchipuram